Tommaso Bisagno (5 April 1935 – 18 January 2014) was an Italian academic and politician.

Biography
Bisagno was born in Signa in 1935. Graduated in chemistry, he was a university professor by profession. He enrolled in Christian Democracy in 1956. He was a municipal councilor in Signa and a regional councilor in Tuscany. He was elected deputy, for the first time, in 1979 and was re-elected for three other legislatures, keeping the seat in the Chamber until 1994. 

He served as undersecretary for defence in the first and second government of Bettino Craxi, in the sixth government of Amintore Fanfani and as undersecretary for public works in the first government of Giuliano Amato.

Elected Mayor of Signa (1990-1995), he was the first Christian Democrat to hold that position. In 2001 he ran for Senate with European Democracy but was not elected.

He died on 18 January 2014 after a long illness, at the age of 79.

References

External links
Profile

1935 births
2014 deaths
People from Signa
Christian Democracy (Italy) politicians
Italian People's Party (1994) politicians
Mayors of places in Tuscany
Deputies of Legislature VIII of Italy
deputies of Legislature IX of Italy
deputies of Legislature X of Italy
deputies of Legislature XI of Italy
Politicians of Tuscany
Italian chemists